Beyond Compare is a proprietary data comparison utility. Aside from comparing files, the program is capable of doing side-by-side comparison of directories, FTP and SFTP directories, Dropbox directories, Amazon S3 directories, and archives. It is available for Windows, Mac OS, and Linux operating systems.  A strength of Beyond Compare is that it can be configured as difftool and mergetool of version control systems, such as git.

Reception
In an April 2009 review, Beyond Compare was awarded four out of five stars by CNET. The reviewers initially found the user interface to be "a little overwhelming", but "quickly got the hang of it", after using the program for a little while. PC World writer Michael Desmond included the program in a 2005 list of utilities for a "Trouble-Free PC". He highlighted the program's "watch list" feature for particular acclaim. Beyond Compare was featured in the March 2005 issue of the Windows IT Pro magazine, in the "What's Hot" section.

Scott Mitchell, writing for MSDN Magazine, identified the program's comparison rules as its most powerful feature. The customizable rules control which differences between two files should be flagged as such. A set of predefined rules are included for the comparison of common file types, such as C++ source code, XML, and HTML files.

Steve Gibson of GRC recommended it as "a really cool...very smart Windows-based source comparison tool".

See also 
 Comparison of file comparison tools
 Comparison of FTP client software

References

External links 
Scooter Software, maker of Beyond Compare

File comparison tools
Data synchronization
Pascal (programming language) software